Jyoti Nivas College is an autonomous college institute for women, situated at Koramangala, Bangalore, India. It was established in 1966 and founded by The Sisters of St. Joseph of Tarbes. It is affiliated to Bengaluru City University.

History
Six Young peasant girls in the little village of Tarbes in France were divinely inspired way back in 1843, to a life of contemplation and prayer, the Congregation of the Sisters of St. Joseph of Tarbes was thus born.

The sisters who arrived in Bangalore in 1882 worked in Bowring Hospital. On seeing that Education was the need of the hour for women in Bangalore, the sisters of the society started Jyoti Nivas College in 1966. Since then Jyoti Nivas has been imparting holistic education to young women.

For the academic year 2019–2020, it was affiliated with Bengaluru City University.

Academics 
Jyoti Nivas College offers 34 courses across 7 streams namely IT, Science, Commerce and Banking, Management, Arts, Vocational, Media and Mass Communication and across 14 degrees like BSc, BA, B.Com, B.Voc, BBA. Hostel facility is available for its students.

References

Christian universities and colleges in India
Colleges in Bangalore
Colleges affiliated to Bangalore University
Educational institutions established in 1966
1966 establishments in Mysore State